Andritz AG is an international technology group, offering plants, equipment, systems and services for various industries. The group's headquarters are in Graz, Austria. The group gets its name from the district of Andritz in which it is located and is listed on the Vienna Stock Exchange.

Andritz employs more than 29,100 employees at over 280 production and service facilities in over 40 countries. In 2022, the company reported a revenue of EUR€7.5 billion, and a net income of €402.6 million.

Business areas
Andritz consists of four main business areas:
Hydro
Pulp and Paper
Metals
Separation

and the business fields
Feed and Biofuel
Pumps
Automation

Andritz Metals
The business area Andritz Metals (former "Rolling Mills and Strip Processing") is the third largest business unit. Andritz Metals designs, develops and erects complete lines for the production and further processing of cold-rolled carbon steel, stainless steel and non-ferrous metal strips, including furnaces, presses and acid regeneration equipment.

Andritz Metals USA Inc.
Headquartered in Callery, PA, USA, ANDRITZ Metals USA Inc. consist of four subsidiaries: 

 Andritz Asko
 Manufacturer of a wide range of slitter knives, slitter tooling, shearing knives and accessories for the ferrous and non-ferrous metal producing industries.
 Andritz Bricmont
 Original equipment manufacturer of furnace technologies for the aluminum and steel industries, including galvanizing systems.
 Andritz Herr-Voss Stamco
 Original equipment manufacturer of coil processing equipment including Precision Levelers, Cut-To-Length, Strand Extensioner Slitting, Tension Leveling and a variety of other metal coil processing lines and services.

History

Highlights in ANDRITZ's history, including major acquisitions

In 1852 the company was founded as an iron foundry in Andritz, a suburb of the city of Graz in Austria. Soon after its foundation, the company's production program was extended to include large capital goods, such as cranes, pumps, water turbines, and later also bridges, steam boilers and engines, as well as mining equipment.

In 1949 Andritz began a lasting cooperation with the Escher Wyss Group of Switzerland, initially in the water turbines sector.

In 1951 Andritz embarked on the production of complete paper machines in cooperation with Escher Wyss.

During the 1960s and 1970s, ANDRITZ continued to grow. The production shops were extended, new machines purchased, and research and development activities intensified. Electrochemical and metallurgical equipment were added to the production program.

In 1987, Andritz began to change its strategic direction, from being a licensee of other equipment manufacturers to become a leading international supplier of its own high-tech production systems.

In 1990, the acquisition of Sprout-Bauer, a US company supplying equipment for mechanical pulp and animal feed production, marked the beginning of the group's expansion policy through acquisitions.

2000/01 One of the largest transactions in terms of sales was the acquisitions of Ahlstrom Machinery Group, which made Andritz a globally leading supplier of pulp production systems.

In 2001 Andritz went public on the Vienna Stock Exchange. Two million new shares were placed successfully with national and international investors.

In 2006, with the acquisition of VA TECH HYDRO, Andritz advanced to a globally leading supplier of electromechanical equipment for hydropower plants

2011 Acquisition of AE&E Austria

2013 Largest acquisition was Schuler GmbH, Germany, leading company in metalforming

2014 Acquisition of Herr-Voss Stamco Inc., USA, leading supplier of coil processing equipment and services for the metals industry

2018 Diatec completes the portfolio in hygiene papers. Xerium Technologies is a global manufacturer and supplier of machine clothing (forming fabrics, press felts, drying fabrics) and roll covers for paper, tissue, and board machines.

2021 Laroche is a supplier of fiber processing technologies. Andritz acquires parts of Air Quality Control System (AQCS) business from GE Steam Power.

2000 -
In March 2000, the company acquired a 50 percent stake in Finland's Ahlstrom Machinery Group from the A. Ahlstrom, a manufacturer of chemical pulp plants and other pulp processing machinery. As part of the purchase agreement, Andritz also received the option of purchasing full control of Ahlstrom Machinery in the event of Andritz going public. In the meantime, Ahlstrom Machinery was renamed Andritz-Ahlstrom and placed under Andritz's Pulp and Paper division.

Following the IPO, Andritz made good on completing its acquisition of full control of Andritz-Ahlstrom, buying up the rest of that subsidiary in July 2001. Another large acquisition was the purchase of the hydroelectric power division of VA Technologie in 2006, as a consequence of a decision of the European Commission in the acquisition of VA Technologie by Siemens. Experts estimated the price at €200 million. The VA Tech Hydro unit changed its name to Andritz VA Tech Hydro GmbH and became a subsidiary of Andritz AG. With 3000 employees and sales of €620 million, the unit increased the size of Andritz by one third, becoming the company's second-largest business.

In May and June 2008, Andritz acquired hydropower technology and certain assets of GE Energy's hydropower business (including test laboratories in Canada and Brazil), as well as GE Energy's majority interest in the joint venture GE Hydro Inepar do Brasil.  Since January 2009, all these acquisitions now operate under "Andritz Hydro" name. Andritz Hydro ranks among the 3 largest hydro companies (with Alstom and Voith-Siemens) with historical references back from 19th century by the acquisition over the years of the following companies and technologies, on which the Andritz Hydro group is the legal successor:

ACM – Vevey, Switzerland
AFI, Canada
Baldwin-Lima-Hamilton, United States
Bell, Switzerland
Bouvier, France
Bouvier-Darling, United States
Charmilles, Switzerland
Dominion Engineering Works, Canada
Dominion Bridge, Canada
Escher Wyss & Cie, Switzerland
Ge Hydro, Canada
Hemi Controls, Canada
I.P.Morris, United States
KMPT Ag, Germany
KMW, Sweden
Lorenzo Avila, Brazil
Pedro Molinari, Brazil
Nohab, Sweden
Pelton Waterwheel, United States
Sulzer Hydro, United States
Tampella, Finland
Voest-Alpine Maschinenbau Gmbh, Austria
Voest-Alpine Ag, Austria
Voest-Alpine Mce, Austria
Va Tech Voest Mce, Austria
Va Tech Escher Wyss, Germany
Va Tech Escher Wyss, Italy
Va Tech Escher Wyss, Spain
Va Tech Hydro, Switzerland
Va Tech Bouvier Hydro, France
Va Tech Hydro, Canada
Va Tech Escher Wyss, Mexico
Va Tech Hidro, Brazil
Va Tech Hydro Usa Corporation
Va Tech Hydro, Indonesia
Va Tech Hydro Flovel, India
Va Tech Hydro, China
Waplans, Sweden

References

External links 

 
Vienna Stock Exchange: Market Data Andritz AG

1852 establishments in the Austrian Empire
Austrian brands
Companies established in 1852
Industrial machine manufacturers
Engine manufacturers of Austria
Companies based in Graz
Pump manufacturers
Water turbine manufacturers
Multinational companies headquartered in Austria